Micramma is a genus of moths of the family Erebidae. The genus was described by Schaus in 1916.

Species
Micramma candalis (Schaus, 1906) Brazil (Paraná)
Micramma croceicosta Schaus, 1916 French Guiana

References

Hypeninae